Cosgrove High School is a government co-educational comprehensive junior secondary school located in , a suburb of Hobart, Tasmania, Australia. Established in 1951 and named in honour of Sir Robert Cosgrove, the school caters for approximately 200 students from Years 7 to 10. The school is administered by the Tasmanian Department of Education.

In 2019 student enrolments were 183. The school principal is Andrew Woodham.

History 
Established in 1951 as the Robert Cosgrove Modern School, in 1962 the school's name was changed to the Robert Cosgrove High School, and in 1968 changed to its current name, Cosgrove High School.

In November 2020, a fire broke out in one of the buildings which hosted Year 9 and 10 students, as well as staff offices. All students were temporarily relocated to Claremont College for two weeks as repairs were being done. Two teenagers were charged with arson in response.

Houses
Cosgrove High School has four houses:
Barton, named after Edmund Barton
Deakin, named after Alfred Deakin
Hughes, named after Billy Hughes
Parkes, named after Henry Parkes

Notable alumni
Scott Bacon, a former politician who represented the electorates of Denison and then Clark in the Tasmanian House of Assembly as a member of the Labor Party

See also 
 List of schools in Tasmania
 Education in Tasmania

References

External links
 Official website

Glenorchy, Tasmania
Public high schools in Hobart
Educational institutions established in 1951
1951 establishments in Australia